Belmonte may refer to:

People and titles

Arts and entertainment
Moses Belmonte (1619–1647), 17th-century Dutch Jewish poet and translator
"Belmonte", protagonist of the Mozart opera  Die Entführung aus dem Serail
Belmonte (cartoonist), pseudonym of Benedito Carneiro Bastos Barreto

Sport
Jason Belmonte (born 1983), Australian professional ten-pin bowler
Juan Belmonte (1892–1962), Spanish bullfighter
Mireia Belmonte García (born 1990), Spanish Olympic swimmer
Nicola Belmonte (born 1987), Italian footballer

Other fields
Prince of Belmonte or Princess Belmonte, a Spanish and Italian noble title
Domenico Pignatelli di Belmonte (1730–1803), Cardinal of the Roman Catholic Church
Gennaro Granito Pignatelli di Belmonte (1851–1948), Cardinal of the Roman Catholic Church
Feliciano Belmonte Jr. (born 1936), Speaker of the House of Representatives of the Philippines from 2010 to 2016
Joy Belmonte (born 1970), Filipino politician, son of Feliciano, and current mayor of Quezon City
Wivina Belmonte, UNICEF staff member

Places

Brazil
 Belmonte, Santa Catarina, a municipality in the State of Santa Catarina
 Belmonte, Bahia, a municipality in the State of Bahia

Iberia
 Belmonte, Cuenca, a municipality in the region of Cuenca, autonomous community of Castile-La Mancha
 Castle of Belmonte (Cuenca)
 Belmonte de Campos, a municipality in the province of Palencia, autonomous community of Castile and León
 Belmonte de Gracián, a municipality in the province of Zaragoza, autonomous community of Aragon
 Belmonte de Miranda, a municipality in the autonomous community of the principality of Asturias
 Belmonte de San José, a municipality in the province of Teruel, autonomous community of Aragon
 Belmonte de Tajo, a municipality in the autonomous community of Madrid
 Belmonte, Portugal, a municipality in the district of Castelo Branco
 Castle of Belmonte (Belmonte)

Italy
 Belmonte Calabro, a commune in the province of Cosenza, region of Calabria
 Belmonte Castello, a commune in the province of Frosinone, region of Lazio
 Belmonte del Sannio, a commune in the province of Isernia, region of Molise
 Belmonte in Sabina, a commune in the province of Rieti, region of Lazio
 Belmonte Mezzagno, a commune in the province of Palermo, region of Sicily
 Belmonte Piceno, a commune in the province of Fermo, region of Marche
 San Colombano Belmonte, a comune in the province of Turin, region of Piedmont

Other uses
Belmonte (film), a 2018 film
Belmonte (rose)
Belmonte (telenovela), a Portuguese telenovela which began in 2013
Belmonte (cheese), an Italian variety of cheese

See also

Belmont (disambiguation) 
Beaumont (disambiguation) 
Bellmont (disambiguation)
Belmont (disambiguation)
Delmonte
Montebello (disambiguation)
Schönberg (disambiguation)